This is a list of Doctor Who audiobooks. The first Doctor Who audiobook, consisting of readings by Gabriel Woolf of the novelisations of The Three Doctors, Carnival of Monsters, and Terror of the Zygons, was produced by the RNIB in 1978 and was available only to the registered blind through the RNIB and libraries. The first audiobook available to the general public was a Tom Baker reading of a State of Decay novelisation, released in 1981.

From 1995 to 1997, recordings of the novelisations of seven Doctor Who serials and three sets of original short stories were released by the BBC on cassette. Each of the novelisations was read by the actor who had portrayed the Doctor in the respective serial. The short stories were read by various actors associated with the series. All of these recordings were re-released in the Tales from the TARDIS MP3-CD collections in 2004.

In 2005 publishing began of two new sets of audiobooks. The first consisted of novelisations of serials from the "Classic" Doctor Who era, the second series consists of original novels from the New Series Adventures line. Starting in 2007, the RNIB produced unabridged versions of selected Ninth and Tenth Doctor audiobooks as well as selected Classic Series novelisations.

Novelisations 
Readings of novelisations of television stories and spinoff productions, most originally published by Target Books. All readings are unabridged unless otherwise stated.

First Doctor

Second Doctor

Third Doctor

Fourth Doctor

Fifth Doctor

Sixth Doctor

Seventh Doctor

Eighth Doctor

Ninth Doctor

Tenth Doctor

Eleventh Doctor

Twelfth Doctor

Thirteenth Doctor

Shalka Doctor

Spinoffs

Original novels 
In addition to novelisation readings, there have been many readings of Doctor Who novels. Unless otherwise noted, these are all from the New Series Adventures range and are unabridged.

First Doctor novels

Second Doctor novels

Third Doctor novels

Fourth Doctor novels

Fifth Doctor novels

Sixth Doctor novels

Seventh Doctor novels

Eighth Doctor novels

War Doctor novels

Ninth Doctor novels

Tenth Doctor novels

Eleventh Doctor novels

Twelfth Doctor novels

Thirteenth Doctor novels

Other novels

Original audiobooks 
In addition to readings of published novels, there have also been a number of original audiobooks not published in print.

First Doctor releases

Second Doctor releases

Third Doctor releases

Fourth Doctor releases

Fifth Doctor releases

Sixth Doctor releases

Seventh Doctor releases

Eighth Doctor releases

Ninth Doctor releases

Tenth Doctor releases

Eleventh Doctor releases

Twelfth Doctor releases

Thirteenth Doctor releases

Beyond the Doctor
A series of stories chronicling the lives of companions after they left the Doctor.

Short stories

Short story anthologies
All readings are unabridged.

Audio annual stories
Stories from World Distributors' annual books. All readings are unabridged.

Non-fiction 
Readings of non-fiction books about the making of Doctor Who, characters from the show, and biographies and memoirs of actors and crew who had a major role in Doctor Who. Unabridged unless otherwise stated.

Biographies and memiors

Other non-fiction

Spinoffs

Torchwood 
Torchwood audiobooks began with abridged readings of published novels, but then switched to exclusive stories not published in print.

Novels
Readings are unabridged unless otherwise stated.

Original audiobooks

The Sarah Jane Adventures 
The Sarah Jane Adventures audiobooks are all original audiobooks not published in print.

Time Hunter 
Audiobook readings of Telos Publishing's Time Hunter series of novellas.

Lethbridge-Stewart 
Audiobook readings of Candy Jar Books's Lethbridge-Stewart series of novels.

Class 
Unabridged Class audiobooks have been published in the United States.

Bernice Summerfield

P.R.O.B.E. 
Audiobooks based on the direct-to-video P.R.O.B.E. series

Iris Wildthyme and Friends

The Brigadier Adventures

UNIT

Others

See also 

 Doctor Who audio productions
 List of Doctor Who audio releases
 List of Doctor Who audio plays by Big Finish

Note

References 

 
 

Audiobooks based on Doctor Who
Audiobooks